South Yemen, officially the People's Democratic Republic of Yemen, also referred to as Democratic Yemen or Yemen (Aden), was a communist state that existed from 1967 to 1990 as a state in the Middle East in the southern and eastern provinces of the present-day Republic of Yemen, including the island of Socotra.

South Yemen's origins can be traced to 1874 with the creation of the British Colony of Aden and the Aden Protectorate, which consisted of two-thirds of the present-day Yemen.  Prior to 1937 what was to become the Colony of Aden had been governed as a part of British India, originally as the Aden Settlement subordinate to the Bombay Presidency and then as a Chief Commissioner's province.  After the collapse of Aden Protectorate, a state of emergency was declared in 1963, when the National Liberation Front (NLF) and the Front for the Liberation of Occupied South Yemen (FLOSY) rebelled against the British rule.

The Federation of South Arabia and the Protectorate of South Arabia merged to become the People's Republic of Yemen on 30 November 1967, which later changed its name to the People's Democratic Republic of Yemen. It became a Marxist–Leninist one-party state in 1969 and was supported by Cuba, East Germany, North Korea and the Soviet Union. It was the only communist state to be established in the Arab world. Despite its efforts to bring stability into the region, it was involved in a brief civil war in 1986. Following the collapse of the USSR, South Yemen was unified with the Yemen Arab Republic, commonly known as "North Yemen", on 22 May 1990 to form the present-day Republic of Yemen. After three years, however, a political crisis arose between the South's YSP and the North's GPC and Islah parties after the parliamentary elections in 1993. South Yemen declared its secession from the North Yemen in 1994 as the Democratic Republic of Yemen. This effort ended after North Yemen occupied the area as a result of the 1994 civil war. Another attempt to restore South Yemen as a nation, with the Southern Transitional Council as its new government, began in 2017 as part of the 2014 Yemeni Civil War.

History

British rule

In 1838, Sultan Muhsin Bin Fadl of the state of Lahej ceded  including Aden to the British. On 19 January 1839, the British East India Company landed Royal Marines at Aden to occupy the territory and stop attacks by pirates against British shipping to India. It then became an important trading hub between British India and the Red Sea, and following the opening of the Suez canal in 1869, it became a coaling station for ships en route to India. Aden was ruled as part of British India until 1937, when the city of Aden became the Colony of Aden. The Aden hinterland and Hadhramaut to the east formed the remainder of what would become South Yemen and was not administered directly by Aden but were tied to Britain by treaties of protection with local rulers of traditional polities that, together, became known as the Aden Protectorate. Economic development was largely centered in Aden, and while the city flourished, the states of the Aden Protectorate stagnated.

Decolonization

In 1963, Aden and much of the Protectorate were joined to form the Federation of South Arabia with the remaining states that declined to join, mainly in Hadhramaut, forming the separate Protectorate of South Arabia. Both of these polities were still tied to Britain with promises of total independence in 1968.
Two nationalist groups, the Front for the Liberation of Occupied South Yemen (FLOSY) and the National Liberation Front (NLF), began an armed struggle known as the Aden Emergency on 14 October 1963 against British control and, with the temporary closure of the Suez Canal in 1967, the British began to withdraw. One faction, NLF, was invited to the Geneva Talks to sign the independence agreement with the British. During its occupation of Aden, the British had signed several treaties of protection with the local sheikhdoms and emirates of the Federation of South Arabia; however, these parties were excluded from the talks, and thus the agreement stated "...the handover of the territory of South Arabia to the (Yemeni) NLF...". Southern Yemen became independent as the People's Republic of Yemen on 30 November 1967, and the National Liberation Front consolidated its control in the country. On 14 December 1967, the PDRY was admitted into the United Nations as a member state.

1969 establishment of a Marxist-Leninist state 
In June 1969 a radical Marxist wing of the NLF gained power in an event known as the Corrective Move. This radical wing reorganised the country into the People's Democratic Republic of Yemen (PDRY) on 30 November 1970. Subsequently, all political parties were amalgamated into the National Liberation Front, renamed the Yemeni Socialist Party, which became the only legal party. The People's Democratic Republic of Yemen established close ties with the Soviet Union, the People's Republic of China, Cuba, and the Palestinian Liberation Organization. East Germany's constitution of 1968 even served as a kind of blueprint for the PDRY's first constitution.

The new government embarked on a programme of nationalisation, introduced central planning, put limits on housing ownership and rent, and implemented land reforms. By 1973, the GDP of South Yemen increased by 25 per cent. And despite the conservative environment and resistance, women became legally equal to men, polygamy, child marriage and arranged marriage were all banned by law. Equal rights in divorce were also sanctioned. The Republic also secularised education and sharia law was replaced by a state legal code.

The major communist powers assisted in the building of the PDRY's armed forces. Strong support from Moscow resulted in Soviet naval forces gaining access to naval facilities in South Yemen. The most significant among them, a Soviet naval and air base on the island of Socotra for operations in the Indian Ocean.

Disputes with North Yemen

Unlike the early decades of East Germany and West Germany, North Korea and South Korea, or North Vietnam and South Vietnam, or China and Taiwan, the Yemen Arab Republic (North Yemen) and South Yemen (PDRY) remained relatively friendly, though relations were often strained. Fighting broke out in 1972, and the short-lived conflict was resolved with negotiations, where it was declared unification would eventually occur.

However, these plans were put on hold in 1979, as the PDRY funded Red rebels in the YAR, and war was only prevented by an Arab League intervention. The goal of unity was reaffirmed by the northern and southern heads of state during a summit meeting in Kuwait in March 1979.

In 1980, PDRY president Abdul Fattah Ismail resigned and went into exile in Moscow, having lost the confidence of his sponsors in the USSR. His successor, Ali Nasir Muhammad, took a less interventionist stance toward both North Yemen and neighbouring Oman.

1986 Civil War

On 13 January 1986, a violent struggle began in Aden between Ali Nasir's supporters and supporters of the returned Ismail, who wanted power back. This conflict, known as the South Yemen Civil War, lasted for more than a month and resulted in thousands of casualties, Ali Nasir's ouster, and Ismail's death. Some 60,000 people, including the deposed Ali Nasir, fled to the YAR. Ali Salim al-Beidh, an ally of Ismail who had succeeded in escaping the attack on pro-Ismail members of the Politburo, then became General Secretary of the Yemeni Socialist Party.

Reforms and attempts for unification

Against the background of the perestroika in the USSR, the main backer of the PDRY, political reforms were started in the late 1980s. Political prisoners were released, political parties were formed and the system of justice was reckoned to be more equitable than in the North. In May 1988, the YAR and PDRY governments came to an understanding that considerably reduced tensions including agreement to renew discussions concerning unification, to establish a joint oil exploration area along their undefined border, to demilitarise the border, and to allow Yemenis unrestricted border passage on the basis of only a national identification card. In November 1989, after returning from the Soviet–Afghan War, Osama bin Laden offered to send the newly formed al-Qaeda to overthrow the South Yemeni government on behalf of Saudi Arabia, but Prince Turki bin Faisal found the plan reckless and declined. In 1990, the parties reached a full agreement on joint governing of Yemen, and the countries were effectively merged as Yemen.

Demographics  
South Yemen's ethnic groups were, as of 2000, ethnic Yemeni Arabs (92.8%), Somalis (3.7%), Afro-Arab (1.1%), Indians and Pakistanis (1%), and other (1.4%).

Politics and social life
South Yemen developed as a Marxist-Leninist, mostly secular society ruled first by the National Liberation Front, which later morphed into the ruling Yemeni Socialist Party.

Foreign relations  
The only avowedly Marxist-Leninist nation in the Middle East, South Yemen received significant foreign aid and other assistance from the USSR and East Germany, which stationed several hundred officers of the Stasi in the country to train the nation's secret police and establish another arms trafficking route to Palestine. The East Germans did not leave until 1990, when the Yemeni government declined to pay their salaries which had been terminated with the dissolution of the Stasi during German reunification.

Relations between South Yemen and several of nearby states were poor. Saudi Arabia only established diplomatic relations in 1976, initially hosting pro-British exiles and supporting armed clashes in the border regions of South Yemen. Relations with Oman declined through the 1970s as the South Yemen government supported the insurgent Marxist Popular Front for the Liberation of Oman. Relations with Ba'athist Iraq  were also low, as South Yemen offered asylum to a number of Iraqi communists.

Legislature and judiciary 
The Supreme People's Council was appointed by the General Command of the National Liberation Front in 1971.

In Aden, there was a structured judicial system with a Supreme Court.

Living standards 
Despite a poor economy, the government ensured a basic level of living standards for all citizens and established a welfare state. Income equality improved, corruption was reduced, and health and educational services expanded.

Education was paid for through general taxation.

There was no housing crisis in South Yemen. Surplus housing built by the British meant that there were few homeless people in Aden, and people built their own houses out of adobe and mud in the rural areas.

Sports
In 1976, the South Yemen national football team participated in the Asian Cup, where the team lost to Iraq 1-0 and to Iran 8–0. They entered their only World Cup qualification campaign in 1986 and were knocked out in the first round by Bahrain. On 2 September 1965, South Yemen played their first international match against the United Arab Republic, to whom they lost 14–0. On 5 November 1989, South Yemen played its last international match against Guinea, to whom they lost 1–0. The team stopped playing when the North and South united in 1990 to form the modern state of Yemen.

In 1988, the South Yemen Olympic team made its debut in the Summer Olympics in Seoul. Sending only eight athletes, the country won no medals. This was the only time the country went to the Olympics until unification in 1990.

Women's rights 
Women's rights under the socialist government were considered the best in the region. Women became legally equal to men and were encouraged to work in public; polygamy, child marriage, and arranged marriage were all banned; and equal rights in divorce received legal sanction.

Governorates
Following independence, South Yemen was divided into six governorates (Arabic sg. muhafazah), with roughly natural boundaries, each given a name by numeral. From 1967 to 1978, they were named officially by numerals only; from 1979 to 1990, they were given new official names. The islands: Kamaran (until 1972, when it was seized by North Yemen), Perim (Meyun), Socotra, Abd-el-Kuri, Samha (inhabited), Darsah and others uninhabited from the Socotra archipelago were districts (mudiriyah) of the First/Aden Governorate being under Prime-Minister of the state supervision.

Economy
During British rule, economic development in South Yemen was restricted to the city of Aden, focused mainly on the port and on the British military bases. As a result, following the British withdrawal, there here was little to no industrial output or mineral wealth exploitation in the country until the mid-1980s, when significant petroleum reserves in the central regions near Shibam and Mukalla were discovered. Foreign aid was minimal, as the British government did not fulfill promises of aid and the Soviet Union offered only US$152 million from 1969 to 1980.

The main sources of income were agriculture, mostly fruit, cereal crops, cattle and sheep, and fishing. The government guaranteed full employment in agriculture for rural citizens, and established a number of collective farms, however, those set up following the Soviet model produced poorer results than cooperative-run farms.

The national budget was 13.43 million dinars in 1976, and the gross national product was US$150 million. The total national debt was $52.4 million.

Airlines
The following airlines had operated from the PDRY:
Aden Airways (1949–1967). Ceased operations on 30 June 1967 at the time of British withdrawal from the Federation and the Protectorate of South Arabia.
Alyemda – Democratic Yemen Airlines (1961–1996). Joined Yemenia, the airline of the former YAR
Yemen Airways (1989–1990)

Movements to revive South Yemen 

Since 2007, some Southerners have been actively protesting for independence, in a movement known as 'Al Hirak' or the Southern Movement. During the Yemen Civil War, in response to incursions by the Houthis and military forces loyal to deposed Yemeni president Ali Abdullah Saleh, members of the Southern Movement formed 'Popular Resistance' militias. Since the Battle of Aden, these armed groups have sought to defend the South against Houthi/Saleh attempts to take over the country and have used civil war as an opportunity to further their struggle for independence.

In late January 2018, separatists loyal to the Southern Transitional Council seized control of the Saudi-backed Yemeni government headquarters in Aden in an apparent coup d'état against the Hadi government.

See also

List of leaders of South Yemen
History of Yemen
Democratic Republic of Yemen
South Yemen Movement
South Yemen insurgency
Dhofar Rebellion
Yemen

References

External links

 South Yemen Anthem (1969–1979), National anthem of Yemen (second and last anthem of South Yemen)

 
Yemen
Yemen
Communism in Yemen
Yemen
Yemen
Yemen
Yemen
Atheist states
Yemen
Yemen